The Australia cricket team toured Bangladesh in August and September 2017 to play two Test matches. It was Australia's first tour to Bangladesh since 2011. Bangladesh won the first Test by 20 runs, their first ever victory against Australia in a Test match. Following the win, Bangladesh's captain Mushfiqur Rahim said "It's a great feeling beating Australia, and I think it was a great effort by the boys". Australia's Steve Smith said "I think they're a dangerous side, particularly here at home". Australia won the second Test by 7 wickets, therefore drawing the series 1-1.

Background
The Australia cricket team were scheduled to tour Bangladesh from 28 September to 21 October 2015 to play a tour match and two Test matches.

A day before the tour was scheduled to start, the Australian team did not leave their country as Cricket Australia (CA) received information about security concerns. The Bangladesh Cricket Board (BCB) said that they were surprised by the delay. Sean Carroll, security manager for CA, meet with the Australian High Commissioner in Bangladesh and the Bangladesh government to discuss the concerns. Despite the ongoing concerns regarding the tour, Bangladesh announced their squad on 28 September. The BCB chief executive Nizamuddin Chowdhury said that "we are expecting all the matches to be played on schedule". On 30 September the Australian cricketers were sent back to their state squads in readiness for the Matador Cup. The BCB said that "the Bangladesh government has committed to additional security on top of the substantial and elaborate arrangements in the BCB's standard Security Plan for international cricket".

On 1 October, Cricket Australia confirmed that the tour had been postponed with a view to re-arrange the matches for a later date. In April 2016, it indicated that it was hoping the tour would go ahead in 2017. In June 2017, Cricket Australia confirmed the tour would take place in August 2017.

Following England's tour to Bangladesh in October 2016, James Sutherland, CEO of Cricket Australia (CA), said the chances of Australia playing in Bangladesh were "quite high". In April 2017, both CA and the Bangladesh Cricket Board (BCB) were negotiating the fixtures for the tour. Nizamuddin Chowdhury, the BCB's chief executive, said they "are now working on the schedule and other details with CA". In May 2017, security assessments took place. Later the same month, Cricket Australia sent a security team to Bangladesh to finalise arrangements for the tour.

Representatives from both CA and the Australian Cricketers' Association (ACA) undertook a pre-tour security visit on 24 July 2017. However, there was an ongoing pay dispute between Australian cricketers, CA and the ACA, with the BCB being informed of the possibility of the tour not going ahead. Earlier in July, the Australia A cricket team had pulled out of a tri-series tournament in South Africa because of the dispute. Australia's Test squad said they would attend a training camp in Darwin ahead of the series, but would not fly to Bangladesh unless there was a resolution to the pay dispute. On 1 August 2017, Australia's captain Steve Smith said that the pay negotiations were progressing, but they needed to be finalised before the tour starts. The following day, a deal was reached in the pay dispute, allowing for the Test series to go ahead as planned. The Australian team arrived in Bangladesh on 18 August 2017, under heavy security.

Prior to the tour starting, the Khan Shaheb Osman Ali Stadium, the venue for the first tour match between the Australians and a BCB XI was waterlogged. The BCB looked at two alternative venues to play the fixture, in case the ground was not ready in time. However, one day before the scheduled start of the match, it was called off, because of the waterlogging.

Squads

Before the series started, Mitchell Swepson was added to the squad and Jackson Bird replaced James Pattinson. Mominul Haque was added to Bangladesh's squad for the first Test, after Mosaddek Hossain suffered an eye infection. Steve O'Keefe was added to Australia's squad ahead of the second Test, as a replacement for Josh Hazlewood, who was injured.

Tour match: BCB XI v Australia

Test series

1st Test

2nd Test

Notes

References

External links
 Series home at ESPN Cricinfo

2017 in Bangladeshi cricket
2017 in Australian cricket
International cricket competitions in 2017
Australian cricket tours of Bangladesh